Puerto Rico competed at the 2017 World Championships in Athletics in London, United Kingdom, 4–13 August 2017.

Results

Men
Track and road events

Women
Track and road events

Combined events – Heptathlon

Nations at the 2017 World Championships in Athletics
World Championships in Athletics
Puerto Rico at the World Championships in Athletics